Michiru (満, みちる, ミチル) is a Japanese given name. Notable people with the name include:

, 1970s J-Pop artist
, Japanese composer
, Japanese pop singer and songwriter
, Japanese voice actor
, Japanese anime scriptwriter 
, Japanese video game composer and pianist
, Japanese voice actress
, Japanese-American actress, singer, and songwriter

Fictional characters
Michiru Aida, the protagonist of the Japanese TV drama Last Friends
Michiru Matsushima, a character in the Japanese visual novel series The Fruit of Grisaia
Michiru, a character in the Japanese visual novel series Air
Sailor Neptune, aka Michiru Kaioh, one of the central characters in the Sailor Moon metaseries
Michiru Nishikiori, a character in the Japanese anime and manga series Kamichama Karin
Michiru Kagemori, the protagonist of the Japanese anime series BNA: Brand New Animal
Michiru Kiryuu, a character in the Japanese anime series Pretty Cure Splash Star
Michiru Otori, a character in the Revue Starlight franchise

Japanese unisex given names